Ketter is a surname. Notable people with the surname include:

 Chris Ketter, Australian politician
 Clay Ketter (born 1961), painter and photographer
 Kerry Ketter (born 1947), ice hockey player
 Phil Ketter (1884–1965), baseball player
 Robert L. Ketter (1929–1989), engineer

See also
 Katter
 Kettering, a town